Falkland Islands Community School (FICS) is an 11–16 mixed secondary school in Stanley, Falkland Islands. It was established in 1992 and houses the public library, also used for school purposes, and the Falkland Islands Leisure Centre.

It directly operates the 11-16 education ending in GCSEs. It does not directly operate post-16 educational services, but it oversees any such education taken by Falkland Island residents in other institutions: the Falkland Islands Government pays Peter Symonds College in England to educate Falkland Islanders for sixth form studies and Chichester College in England to educate Falkland Islanders for national diplomas and NVQs.

Facilities 
Rural Falkland Islanders, as well as dependents of military workers at Mount Pleasant, board at Stanley House. There is a  swimming pool that is a part of the leisure centre.

Gallery

References

External links 
 
 

Education in the Falkland Islands
Schools in South America
Secondary schools in British Overseas Territories
Buildings and structures in Stanley, Falkland Islands
Educational institutions established in 1992
1992 establishments in South America
1992 establishments in British Overseas Territories